The 1989–90 Arkansas Razorbacks men's basketball team represented the University of Arkansas in the 1989–90 college basketball season. The head coach was Nolan Richardson, serving for his fifth year. The team played its home games in Barnhill Arena in Fayetteville, Arkansas. This team won the second of three straight SWC regular season and conference tournament championships. The 1990 Hogs defeated Princeton, Dayton, North Carolina, and SWC rival Texas to make it to the Final Four of the NCAA tournament, before losing to the Duke Blue Devils.

Roster

Schedule and results

|-
!colspan=9 style=| Non-conference season

|-
!colspan=9 style=| Regular season

|-
!colspan=9 style=| SWC Tournament

|-
!colspan=9 style=| NCAA Tournament

Sources

Rankings

Awards and honors
Nolan Richardson – SWC Coach of the Year

References

Arkansas Razorbacks men's basketball seasons
Arkansas

Arkansas
NCAA Division I men's basketball tournament Final Four seasons
Razor
Razor